Frank Báez is a Dominican poet, editor, and writer, born in 1978 in Santo Domingo, Dominican Republic.

Frank’s collection of stories Págales tú a los psicoanalistas won the 2006 Santo Domingo Book Fair First Prize for short stories. His poetry collection Postales also won the National Poetry Prize Salomé Ureña in 2009. Frank is an editor of the online poetry review Ping Pong.

He also is a member of the band El Hombrecito (The Little Man).

Books
 Jarrón y otros poemas. Editorial Betania, Madrid, 2004.
 Postales, 2009.
 En Rosario no se baila cumbia
 En Granada no duerme nadie
 Págales tú a los pscicoanalistas (For the Psychoanalysts, You Pick Up the Tab!) Editorial Ferilibro, Santo Domingo, 2007. 
 Postales, 2009. 
 Latin American anthology Cuerpo plural: Antología de la poesía hispanoamericana contemporánea, Editorial Pre Textos, 2010
 Anoche soñé que era un DJ / Last Night I Dreamt I Was A DJ. Translated by P. Scott Cunningham and Hoyt Rogers. Jai-Alai Books, 2014.

Albums
 La última Vuelta 
 Llegó El Hombrecito (The Hombrecito Has Arrived)
 La última vuelta en vivo en el Palacio de Bellas Artes

References

External links
"Nocturne" by Frank Báez.
Cuatro poemas de Frank Báez
El Hombrecito
Revista Ping Pong
Jai-Alai Books

1978 births
Living people
21st-century Dominican Republic poets
Dominican Republic male poets
21st-century male writers
Caribbean writers